The Giant Eagle of the North Park  is a park and tourist attraction in Agoo, La Union, Philippines. It features a concrete sculpture known as Eagle of the North by Anselmo Day-ag. The eagle sculpture is depicted with its wings spread as if it is preparing to take flight and symbolizes the influence of the Marcos family.

References

Buildings and structures in La Union
Statues in the Philippines